Keynan Knox (born 6 April 1999) is a South African rugby union player for Munster in the United Rugby Championship and European Rugby Champions Cup. He plays as a prop and represents Young Munster in the All-Ireland League.

Early life
Born in South Africa, Knox attended Michaelhouse, a boarding school where Springboks such as Ruan Combrinck, Ross Cronjé, Patrick Lambie and Pat Cilliers, and South African-born Ireland international Robbie Diack and former Munster player Pat Howard also attended.

Youth rugby
Knox captained Michaelhouse's first XV rugby team during 2017, and featured for the Sharks provincial side during the under-18 Craven Week (also in 2017), where his set-piece and general play impressed.

Munster
On the back of strong performances at school level, Knox caught the attention of then-Munster CEO Garrett Fitzgerald, and he moved to Ireland upon finishing school to join the provinces academy setup in December 2017. He featured in all five of Munster A's fixtures during the 2018–19 Celtic Cup, and signed a three-year contract with the province in February 2019, which saw Knox complete year three of the academy before progressing to the senior squad.

Because Knox joined Munster's academy before 31 December 2017, he qualified for Ireland based on residency in 2020, as this was before World Rugby changed the residency period a player must serve before qualifying for a country from three to five years. He made his senior competitive debut for Munster on 28 September 2019, featuring as a replacement in the provinces opening 2019–20 Pro14 39–9 win against Welsh side Dragons in Thomond Park, and he made his first start for the province in their 33–23 win against Cardiff Blues on 2 November 2019.

Knox scored his first try for Munster in their 31–17 win against Italian side Benetton in round 16 of the 2020–21 Pro14 on 19 March 2021, and made his Champions Cup debut for Munster in their 2021–22 pool B round 2 fixture at home to French club Castres on 18 December 2021, coming on as a replacement for John Ryan in the province's 19–13 win. Knox signed a two-year contract extension in January 2022. He featured off the bench in Munster's historic 28–14 win against a South Africa XV in Páirc Uí Chaoimh on 10 November 2022.

References

External links

Munster Senior Profile
Munster Academy Profile
URC Profile

1999 births
Living people
White South African people
Alumni of Michaelhouse
South African rugby union players
Young Munster players
Munster Rugby players
Rugby union props